DZ Bank AG is the second largest bank in Germany by asset size and the central institution for around 800 cooperative banks and their around 8,500 branch offices. Within the German Cooperative Financial Group, which is one of Germany's largest private sector financial service organizations, DZ Bank functions both as a central institution and as a corporate and investment bank. 

DZ Bank is an acronym for Deutsche Zentral-Genossenschaftsbank (literally "German Central Cooperative Bank"). 

As a holding, the DZ Bank Group defines itself primarily as a service provider for local cooperative banks and their 30 million or so clients. The DZ Bank Group includes: DVB Bank, a transportation finance bank; Bausparkasse Schwäbisch Hall, a building society; DZ HYP, a provider of commercial real estate finance; DZ Privatbank Gruppe; R+V Versicherung, an insurance company; TeamBank, a provider of consumer finance; Union Investment Group, an asset management company; VR Leasing; and various other specialized institutions. 

DZ Bank, headquartered in Frankfurt, Germany, is a member of CIBP, EACB, the Euro Banking Association, and Unico. It maintains branches, subsidiaries and representative offices in key financial centers and economic regions worldwide. The DZ Bank building in Berlin, located at Pariser Platz 3, was designed by architect Frank Gehry. 

DZ Bank also has one of the most significant collections of contemporary artistic photography which today comprises over 6,000 works by more than 550 artists.

In 2016 DZ Bank was merged with WGZ Bank, the central institute of the cooperative banks of both the Rheinland (Rhineland)  and Westfalen (Westphalia).

Investments 
DZ Bank is a shareholder of Canadian oil and gas company TC Energy, which is behind the controversial Coastal GasLink Pipeline slated to be built on unceded Wet'suwet'en Nation territory in Northern British Columbia. DZ Bank increased their stake on 31 March 2020 from 1.22 million to 4.27M shares, an increase of ~250%.

See also

 German Cooperative Financial Group
 Bundesverband der Deutschen Volksbanken und Raiffeisenbanken

References

External links 

 
 Annual Report - DZ BANK Group

Banks based in Frankfurt
Cooperative banks of Germany
Banks under direct supervision of the European Central Bank